Monica Ginestre, better known by her stage name Monica Lionheart, is an American electro-acoustic, singer-songwriter, producer, DJ and multi-instrumentalist. She began her music career as a member of Iluminada, is the founder of the electronic rock band Zigmat, and collaborated in Pacha Massive before forming her own solo project in 2012.

Early life 
Lionheart's early education began with piano lessons starting at the age of 5, while a large portion of her childhood was spent traveling from Spain to Puerto Rico.  It was then that she began learning about songwriting and improvisation. Her father's eventual work transfer led Lionheart to San Antonio, Texas where she would spend her teenage years learning the flute and acoustic guitar. Later, while still in San Antonio, she attended Douglas Mac Arthur High School and played in their jazz and marching band, as well as singing in her school and church choirs.

However, it was not until she got accepted into her high school's advanced music theory class where she would finally begin to make her mark as a successful musician.  She went to win the award for Best Original Composition, which led her to collaborate with the San Antonio Symphony's resident composer, Robert Xavier Rodríguez.

College years and iluminada 
Lionheart attended the Berklee College of Music, where she received the Berklee Entering Student Talent Scholarship and the Ford Salute to Education Academic Award. There she majored in education and performed/composed with the electronica group Iluninada, as well as performed in the string and electronic ensemble Ideoplastic. iluminada quickly established themselves as one of the most innovative bands in Boston. Fusing elements of rock, electronic dance music, and trip-hop into a style of their own, the group united a diverse set of musicians whose distinct backgrounds collectively defined the band's sound. During this time, the band released a full-length album entitled The Ethereal Current and soon after, an EP titled, Transparent Walls. The band toured much of the US and England, opening up for acts such as Reel Big Fish and Wishbone Ash. One of iluminada's most memorable shows was at the Middle East Downstairs with Kaki King and St. Vincent (Annie Clark) as openers.

After graduating cum laude at Berklee College of Music, she decided to continue her education at New York University where she received the Dean's Academic Scholarship and graduated with a master's degree in Music Technology.

Zigmat 
While in New York, Lionheart formed the electronic rock band Zigmat.  The band became known as an explosive electro-rock band from New York City. The mixture of electronics, live rock, and Latin dance beats were often compared to the Brazilian Girls, Metric, Daft Punk, and the  Yeah Yeah Yeah's. Lionheart's bilingual lyrics, unpredictable light shows, and audience interaction combined and produced an exhilarating and multi-faceted performance. Zigmat began playing around New York City's East Village in clubs such as Piano's and  Nublu, garnering a reputation as an unforgettable high-energy outfit. After selling out the well-known Mercury Lounge, they were invited to participate in rock festivals CMJ and LAMC. Their debut self-titled album was released in 2007 and became the first stepping stone for the band in the US.  From there, Zigmat (Monica Lionheart) was asked to perform for a television commercial starring Gisele Bundchen. The commercial featured the song "So Sure".

Zigmat was later joined by various top musicians while touring in Mexico, Brazil and the US, in between playing notable venues in New York City. Such sold-out performances were held at venues such as the Canal Room, Highline Ballroom and Joe's Pub. Zigmat has also performed for the LAMC Festival and was chosen as the best emerging artist of LAMC in 2009, also participating at the CMJ festival and SXSW.

In May 2009, Zigmat released Sounds of Machines, their second full-length album in the US. The first music video to be featured from that album was "Machine." The album consists of nine tracks, each showing a different aspect of Lionheart's vocal agility, which Billboard called “the band’s secret weapon.” Four of the tracks deal with the pains, wants and frustrations of love: the album opens with the introspective, electro-ballad "Whisper" that describes longing and regret, then moves into the attitude of anger and abandonment with the track "Decide", demanding the lover to “shut up” in both English and Spanish. "Light of the Moon" paints a dark picture of pseudo-sadistic lust while the track "So Sure" depicts an unrequited love. Monica uses poetic lyrics in the tracks "Watch The World", "Between Bullets", and "Fire," each one displaying Lionheart's upper registers with a hushed seraphic quality. "Don't Tire" is the album's other Span-glish track, and "Machine" closes out the album with the band's signature haunting riffs.

Billboard 's review about the album, “the band’s debut release blends cultures and enigmatic styles…[and it] kneads in a dash of rock and pop flair and has already inspired comparisons to such established trip-hop acts as Massive Attack, Air and Goldfrapp.” The Improper Magazine says, “the electronic sounds they make forged with [Lionheart’s] out-of-this-world vocals and tantalizing effects make Zigmat one extremely arresting and sensual musical concoction.”

Zigmat's music has been featured in the film Backseat (by Bruce Van Dusen) and has garnered local television appearances in New York City (Hit Records Nightlife Videos) and Philadelphia (NBC's The 10! Show) as well as national TV appearances on Fox's Fearless Music TV, Blender and on SiTV in Los Angeles. Radio broadcasts include Batanga Radio, KPFA in Los Angeles, and KCRW's The Morning Becomes Eclectic.

In 2009, Zigmat signed with Spanish label Actua Musica and began touring for much of that year, performing at Europe's Sonar Festival held in Barcelona, Spain whose appearances also included Radiohead, Air and Sigur Ros. Broadcasts on Radio Nacional de Espana, Radio 3 and performances at the Circulo de Bellas Artes all ushered Zigmat into the European music circuit, as well as features in Vanity Fair, Blender and Billboard Magazine in American, European and Brazilian editions.

“Zigmat’s music is edgy, rockin’, melodic and dreamy. It's a wonderful fusion that makes for great energy in their recordings and on stage.” — DJ Raul Campos, KCRW

Pacha Massive 
In 2010, Lionheart dismantled Zigmat and began working with singer, multi-instrumentalist and producer, Ramon Nova of Pacha Massive. The group released its debut album All Good Things on Nacional Records. Pacha Massive has shared the stage with artists like  Morcheeba, Taio Cruz, Ozomatli, Café Tacvba, Los Amigos Invisibles, Aterciopelados, Sidestepper, among many others. MTV Tr3s selected Pacha Massive as the channel's first Descubre and Download artist, featuring the single "Don't Let Go". They also co-hosted the popular weekly countdown show Mi TRL.

Nova approached Lionheart regarding collaboration on Pacha Massive's sophomore release, If You Want It. Lionheart worked with Nova on writing and singing on track "Lejos Cerca" and sang on the singles "If You Want It" and "Tonight".

Solo career 
While teaching music at Central Park East elementary school in Harlem, New York. Lionheart performed, composed and collected a body of work whose texture was more organic and mellifluous than the music in previous projects. She spent the summer of 2011 in Santorini, Greece where she completed Indian Summer. In 2012, she made a return to her former label while signing with Latin Alternative music powerhouse, Nacional Records.

Indian Summer
Lionheart's Indian Summer was released on April 14, 2012 by Nacional Records and was well received by critics in the U.S. Produced by Alon Leventon and Lionheart, the songs feature Lionheart's acoustic guitar in straightforward arrangements. Music videos were released for the album's songs "Escape Strategy", "Let Go", "Rock to Ankles" and "Relampago" which went into MTV and VH1's rotations and received features in  Latina Magazine, Remezcla and Billboard Magazine.

One of Indian Summers two Spanish tracks, "Relampago" was used in an episode of the HBO Latino series  Capadocia. During this period Lionheart has also worked instrumental music for various commercials, taught, toured and organized music workshops at colleges and universities such as STUK in Belgium, Midi Station, in Brussels and throughout the world with the band Dizzy Ventilators.

"The Future"
In May 2014, Monica continued her solo career while releasing "The Future", a playful, one-off single produced by Yusuke Yamamoto and herself.  She released a video for the track which was premiered on Concert Blogger on June 10, 2014.  There are two remixes of the single, one produced by the Barcelona-based alt-pop band The Pinker Tones and the other by Dj Afro of Los Amigos Invisibles.

Missed Connections
Produced by Steve Wall (Pearl and the Beard) with Dan Molad (of Lucius) and Ryan Alfred (of Calexico), Missed Connections was released January 29, 2016. Time Out Magazine says, "Singer-songwriter-multi-instrumentalist Monica Lionheart layers her frosty voice over wafty electropop in a manner that suggests dry ice—and lots of it—plus St. Vincent, and early Cure records interpreted by a tropicalia singer. It's gorgeous stuff, in other words." Lionheart recorded duet with artist Gabriel Rios and the strings were written and recorded with Yoed Nir (Regina Spektor, Rufus Wainwright) for the song "Ghost" the sixth track on the record.  "Recommended for fans of Goldfrapp, St. Vincent or Portishead, this Brooklyn-based Berklee alum brings a freshness to the electro-pop genre with her distinctive vocals that are both haunting and enchanting," says Paste Magazine.

Bodega Beat

Produced by Monica Lionheart, the multi-lingual reggaeton flavored album Bodega Beat was released May 28, 2021. An upbeat new release that charms and excites in equal measure. According to Broken 8 Records, "the first single, ‘Baila’ is a perfect illustration of Monica’s sound, as well as a dynamic precursor to the release of her upcoming new album. Filled with a warm, retro-pop sound that incorporates flowing analog synths, dynamic Latin vibes, and a wistful nostalgic vibe, everything about the new single is built to impress and polished to perfection." Bodega Beat features several vocalists that play off each other perfectly and a glistening electro-pop sound that perfectly blends with undercurrents of trap and reggaeton. 

Bodega Beat layers a maelstrom of different styles and samples to create one of the most immersive records that 2021 has heard so far. Bringing a freshness and expansive quality to the blossoming electro-pop genre, Monica's new album shines with her distinctive vocals that are absolutely and effortlessly enchanting says Broken 8 Records.

Discography

Albums
 Indian Summer (by Nacional Records April 14, 2012) 
 Missed Connections (January 29, 2016)
 Bodega Beat (May 28, 2021)

Singles
 "Escape Strategy" Remix (by Nacional Records February 26, 2013) 
 "The Future”  (2014)
 “Run” (2015)
 “Strangers” (2015)
 “Baila” (2021)
 “Hablame De Ti” (2021)
 “Mio” (2021)
 “Golden” (2021)
 “Bodega” (2021)

References

American singer-songwriters
Living people
Nacional Records artists
Year of birth missing (living people)